Bommasamudra is a village in Dharwad district of Karnataka, India.

Demographics
As of the 2011 Census of India there were 268 households in Bommasamudra and a total population of 1,405 consisting of 724 males and 681 females. There were 219 children ages 0-6.

References

Villages in Dharwad district